Iveta Grófová (born 31 October 1980) is a Slovak film director. She studied at the Academy of Performing Arts in Bratislava (VŠMU). Her directorial debut was the 2012 film Made in Ash, which was nominated as Slovakia's submission for the Academy Award for Best Foreign Language Film. Grófová's second film, Piata loď, was screened at the 67th Berlin International Film Festival. It went on to be nominated in 10 categories at the 2018 Sun in a Net Awards.

Selected filmography

Director
Made in Ash (2012)
Piata loď (2017)

References

External links

1980 births
Living people
Slovak women film directors
People from Trenčín
Slovak screenwriters